VV SJC is a football club from Noordwijk, Netherlands. VV SJC plays in the 2017–18 Sunday Hoofdklasse A.

In the 2021–22 season, VV SJC qualified for the promotion playoffs, but lost 7-0 on aggregate in the first round vs. OJC Rosmalen.

References

External links
 Official site

Football clubs in the Netherlands
Football clubs in South Holland
Sport in Noordwijk
Association football clubs established in 1920
1920 establishments in the Netherlands